Glass is an amorphous material commonly used in windows, tableware, optoelectronics, and decorative items.

Glass or Glasses may also refer to:

Common uses
 Glass (drinkware), a drinking vessel
 Glasses, spectacles or eyeglasses

Arts, entertainment, and media

Film and television
 Glass (1958 film), a short documentary film about the glass industry in the Netherlands
 Glass (1989 film), an Australian erotic thriller
 Glass (2019 film), a film directed by M. Night Shyamalan
 Glass, television identifications 1991–1993 for BBC2
 "The Glasses", a 1993 episode of the TV series Seinfeld

Music
 Glass (band), a progressive rock band from the Pacific Northwest
 Glass (EP), a 2003 EP by the Sea and Cake
 Glasses (album), a 1979 album by Joe McPhee
 "Glass" (composition), a 2018 composition by Alva Noto and Ryuichi Sakamoto
 "Glass" (Thompson Square song), 2011
 "Glass" (From Her Eyes song), 2015
 "Glass", a song by Joy Division from Still
 "Glass", a 1967 song by the Sandpipers
 "Glass", a song by Bat for Lashes from Two Suns
 "Glass", a song by Julian Casablancas from Phrazes for the Young
 "Glass", a composition by Hania Rani from Esja
 "The Glass", a song by The Story So Far from the 2013 album What You Don't See

Other media
 Glass (novel), a novel by Ellen Hopkins

Places
 Glass, Aberdeenshire, a village in Scotland 
 Glass, Texas, an unincorporated community in Texas
 River Glass (disambiguation)

Science and technology

Computing
 GLASS (software bundle), a solution stack based on GemStone, Linux, Apache, Seaside and Smalltalk
 Glass, an esoteric programming language developed by Gregor Richards in 2005
 Google Glass, a wearable computer with a head-mounted display

Materials
 Glass, the disordered (amorphous) quality of a spin glass magnet
 Glass transition, or glass–liquid transition
 Volcanic glass, a substance formed by rapid cooling of magma

Other uses in science and technology
 Glass or methamphetamine, a psychostimulant of the phenethylamine and amphetamine class of psychoactive drugs

Other uses
 Glass (surname), a list of people with the name
 Glassing, a physical attack using a glass as a weapon
 Marine sandglass, a device for measuring time at sea in the 18-19th centuries, with increments being measured in "glasses"

See also
 Glacé (disambiguation)
 Glas (disambiguation)
 Glasse, a surname
 Glassy (disambiguation)